Goulet River may refer to:

Goulet River (Bécancour River tributary),  Arthabaska Regional County Municipality, Centre-du-Québec, Quebec, Canada
Goulet River (Vermillon River tributary),  Mauricie, Quebec, Canada